As distinct from the Western medical concept of urinary bladder, this concept from traditional Chinese medicine is more a way of describing a set of interrelated functions than an anatomical organ.  (See Zang Fu theory)

The Bladder is a Yang (Fu) organ; its paired Yin (Zang) organ is the Kidney.  Both are associated with the element of water and the emotion of fear.

As opposed to western medicine, where the bladders function is the storage and excretion of urine, the bladder in traditional Chinese medicine has extended functions, including how fluids are transformed during urine production. Fluids are still sent from the small intestine to the bladder for storage, but the bladder's capabilities are dependent on the kidney yang. If the kidney is yang deficient, the bladder may not have the sufficient qi and heat to transform fluids properly into urine. This could result in overly clear urine that must be excreted more frequently.

References

External links
The role of the bladder in Traditional Chinese Medicine

Traditional Chinese medicine